Senkase is a settlement in the Savanes Region of northern Togo. It is a few kilometres away from the Togo – Burkina Faso – Ghana tripoint and the village is a border checkpoint between Togo and Burkina Faso and between Togo and Ghana.

Populated places in Savanes Region, Togo
Burkina Faso–Togo border crossings
Ghana–Togo border crossings
Savanes Region, Togo